Doubletake is a BBC comedy programme, created by Alison Jackson. It made extensive use of celebrity look-alikes playing their doubles in apparently embarrassing situations, seen through CCTV cameras and amateur video, using distance shots and shaky camera-work to disguise the true identity of those being filmed.

External links
 Comedy Guide

BBC television comedy